The 2018 United States House of Representatives elections in Oregon were held on Tuesday, November 6, 2018, to elect the five U.S. representatives from the U.S. state of Oregon; one from each of the state's five congressional districts. The primaries were held on May 15, 2018. The elections and primaries coincided with the elections and primaries of other federal and state offices. 

All five incumbents were re-elected, leaving Oregon at a 4–1 split in favor of the Democrats.

Overview
Results of the 2018 United States House of Representatives elections in Oregon by district:

District 1

The 1st district is located in northwestern Oregon and stretches from coastal cities of the Astoria and Seaside, to the parts of Portland and the surrounding suburbs such as Beaverton, Hillsboro, and Newberg. This district has a PVI of D+9. The incumbent is Democrat Suzanne Bonamici, who has represented the district since 2012. She was re-elected with 60% of the vote in 2016. She will face Republican nominee John Verbeek in the November 2018 general election.

Democratic primary
 Ricky Barajas
 Suzanne Bonamici, incumbent
 Michael Stansfield

Primary results

Republican primary
 George Griffith, engineer
 Preston Miller
 John Verbeek

Primary results

Independent primary

Primary results

General election

Results

District 2

Oregon's second district is made up of rural eastern Oregon and stretches into southern Oregon, including Bend, Klamath Falls, and Medford. This district is the most Republican district in Oregon with a PVI of R+11.

The incumbent, Republican Greg Walden of Hood River, was re-nominated in the May 2018 primary election. He has represented the district since 1999, and was re-elected with 72% of the vote in 2016. He has faced little serious opposition in recent years, but in 2018 has been heavily criticized by constituents for helping to write a bill to repeal and replace the Affordable Care Act.

Democrat Jamie McLeod-Skinner of Terrebonne won her party's nomination in May 2018. She has criticized Walden for skipping public events and declining to take strong stands on behalf of his constituents. Incumbent Walden agreed in July to debate McLeod-Skinner, but as of early September, no debate has been scheduled.

As of November 2018, national handicappers consider the district "safe Republican."

Democratic primary
 Eric Burnette
 Michael Byrne, stonemason
 Jim Crary, attorney
 Raz Mason, teacher
 Jamie McLeod-Skinner, environmental attorney
 Jennifer Neahring, physician
 Timothy White, CFO

Primary results

Republican primary
 Randy Pollock
 Paul Romero
 Greg Walden, incumbent

Primary results

Independent primary

Primary results

General election

Polling

Results
This race was the closest race ever in Greg Walden's political history, the first time he had received less than 60% of the votes.

District 3

The 3rd district is centered around the city of Portland, and includes the surrounding suburbs such as Estacada, Fairview, and Gresham. This is the most Democratic-friendly district in the state with a PVI of D+24. The incumbent is Democrat Earl Blumenauer, who has represented the district since 1996. He was re-elected with 72% of the vote in 2016. He will face Independent Party nominee Marc Koller and Republican write-in nominee Tom Harrison in the November 2018 general election.

Democratic primary
 Earl Blumenauer, incumbent
 Eric Hafner, activist
 Ben Lavine
 Charles Rand Barnett

Primary results

Republican primary

Primary results

Independent primary

Primary results

General election

Results

District 4

The 4th district is located in the South Coast region of Oregon. Cities in this district include Coos Bay, Eugene, and Roseburg. This is a highly competitive district with an EVEN PVI. The incumbent is Democrat Peter DeFazio, who has represented the district since 1987. He was re-elected with 55% of the vote in 2016. He faced Art Robinson for the fifth time; Robinson had been the Republican nominee in the district in every election since 2010.

Democratic primary
 Daniel Arcangel
 Peter DeFazio, incumbent

Primary results

Republican primary
 Court Boice, Curry County commissioner
 Jo Rae Perkins, business owner
 Michael Polen
 Art Robinson, chemist
 Stefan Strek

Primary results

Independent primary

Primary results

General election

Results

District 5

The 5th district is centered around the state capital, Salem. The district stretches from the Central Coast region to the southern Portland suburbs, including Lake Oswego, Wilsonville, and Oregon City. The district was highly competitive, with an EVEN PVI. The incumbent is Democrat Kurt Schrader, who has represented the district since 2009. He was re-elected with 53% of the vote in 2016. He faced Republican nominee Mark Callahan in the November 2018 general election.

Democratic primary
 Kurt Schrader, incumbent
 Peter Wright

Primary results

Republican primary
 Mark Callahan, perennial candidate
 Joey Nations
 Robert Reynolds

Primary results

Independent primary

Primary results

General election

Polling

Results

References

External links
Candidates at Vote Smart 
Candidates at Ballotpedia 
Campaign finance at FEC 
Campaign finance at OpenSecrets

Official campaign websites for first district candidates
Suzanne Bonamici (D) for Congress
John Verbeek (R) for Congress

Official campaign websites for second district candidates
Jamie McLeod-Skinner (D) for Congress
Greg Walden (R) for Congress

Official campaign websites for third district candidates
Earl Blumenauer (D) for Congress
Marc Koller (I) for Congress

Official campaign websites for fourth district candidates
Peter DeFazio (D) for Congress
Art Robinson (R) for Congress

Official campaign websites for fifth district candidates
Mark Callahan (R) for Congress
Marvin Sandnes (G) for Congress
Kurt Schrader (D) for Congress

Oregon
2018
United States House of Representatives